Yumi Miyakawa (born 2 November 1991) is a Japanese handball player for Omron and the Japanese national team.

She represented Japan at the 2019 World Women's Handball Championship.

References

1991 births
Living people
Sportspeople from Aomori Prefecture
Japanese female handball players